Steve Gould (born 25 March 1950) is a British singer and musician who was the lead singer and bassist (later, rhythm guitarist) of the late 1960s to mid 1970s London-based progressive rock band, Rare Bird. They had one hit single titled "Sympathy" which peaked at No. 27 in the UK Singles Chart.

Gould went on to form the mainstream band Runner on Island Records in the late 1970s after Rare Bird broke up. The band's debut album charted in the Billboard 200.

When Runner did not work out due to differences with the label, Gould joined the Alvin Lee band in 1980, with whom he played bass on different occasions during two decades. On albums such as  Free Fall (1980) and RX5 (1981) he played an active role as vocalist and co-composer.

References

Living people
1950 births
People from Battersea
Singers from London
English songwriters
English male singers
English male guitarists
English rock singers
English rock guitarists
British male songwriters